UC San Diego Health La Jolla station is a San Diego Trolley station located on the UC San Diego East Campus, which includes the UC San Diego Health La Jolla campus of hospitals and medical facilities. The station is elevated just south of Voigt Drive at Campus Point Drive and is nearby to the Preuss School, the Jacobs Medical Center hospital, the Moores Cancer Center, and Scripps Memorial Hospital La Jolla.

It opened on November 21, 2021, as a new station on the Blue Line, constructed as part of the Mid-Coast Trolley extension project.

Station layout 
There are two tracks, each served by a side platform.

References 

Blue Line (San Diego Trolley)
San Diego Trolley stations in San Diego
Railway stations in the United States opened in 2021
Railway stations in California at university and college campuses